John Henson may refer to:

John Henson (basketball) (born 1990), American basketball player
John Henson (comedian) (born 1967), TV show host
John Henson (politician), New Hampshire politician
John Henson (puppeteer) (1965–2014), Muppet performer, the son of Jim Henson